Methylobacterium phyllostachyos  is a Gram-negative,  non-spore-forming, aerobic and facultatively methylotrophic bacteria from the genus Methylobacterium which has been isolated from the surface of a bamboo leaf.

References

Further reading 
 

Hyphomicrobiales
Bacteria described in 2014